A court of appeals, also called a court of appeal, appellate court, appeal court, court of second instance or second instance court, is any court of law that is empowered to hear an appeal of a trial court or other lower tribunal. In much of the world, court systems are divided into at least three levels: the trial court, which initially hears cases and reviews evidence and testimony to determine the facts of the case; at least one intermediate appellate court; and a supreme court (or court of last resort) which primarily reviews the decisions of the intermediate courts, often on a discretionary basis. A particular court system's supreme court is its highest appellate court. Appellate courts nationwide can operate under varying rules.

Under its standard of review, an appellate court decides the extent of the deference it would give to the lower court's decision, based on whether the appeal were one of fact or of law. In reviewing an issue of fact, an appellate court ordinarily gives deference to the trial court's findings. It is the duty of trial judges or juries to find facts, view the evidence firsthand, and observe witness testimony. When reviewing lower decisions on an issue of fact, courts of appeal generally look for clear error. The appellate court reviews issues of law  (anew, no deference) and may reverse or modify the lower court's decision if the appellate court believes the lower court misapplied the facts or the law. An appellate court may also review the lower judge's discretionary decisions, such as whether the judge properly granted a new trial or disallowed evidence. The lower court's decision is only changed in cases of an "abuse of discretion". This standard tends to be even more deferential than the "clear error" standard.

Before hearing any case, the court must have jurisdiction to consider the appeal.  The authority of appellate courts to review the decisions of lower courts varies widely from one jurisdiction to another. In some areas, the appellate court has limited powers of review. Generally, an appellate court's judgment provides the final directive of the appeals courts as to the matter appealed, setting out with specificity the court's determination that the action appealed from should be affirmed, reversed, remanded or modified. Depending on the type of case and the decision below, appellate review primarily consists of: an entirely new hearing (a non trial de novo); a hearing where the appellate court gives deference to factual findings of the lower court; or review of particular legal rulings made by the lower court (an appeal on the record).

Bifurcation of civil and criminal appeals
While many appellate courts have jurisdiction over all cases decided by lower courts, some systems have appellate courts divided by the type of jurisdiction they exercise. Some jurisdictions have specialized appellate courts, such as the Texas Court of Criminal Appeals, which only hears appeals raised in criminal cases, and the U.S. Court of Appeals for the Federal Circuit, which has general jurisdiction but derives most of its caseload from patent cases, on one hand, and appeals from the Court of Federal Claims on the other. In the United States, Alabama, Tennessee, and Oklahoma also have separate courts of criminal appeals. Texas and Oklahoma have the final determination of criminal cases vested in their respective courts of criminal appeals, while Alabama and Tennessee allow decisions of its court of criminal appeals to be finally appealed to the state supreme court.

Courts of criminal appeals

Civilian
Court of Criminal Appeal (England and Wales), abolished 1966
Court of Criminal Appeal (Ireland), abolished 2014
 U.S. States:
Alabama Court of Criminal Appeals
Oklahoma Court of Criminal Appeals
Tennessee Court of Criminal Appeals
Texas Court of Criminal Appeals

Military
United States Army Court of Criminal Appeals
Navy-Marine Corps Court of Criminal Appeals (United States)
Coast Guard Court of Criminal Appeals (United States)
Air Force Court of Criminal Appeals (United States)

Courts of civil appeals
Alabama Court of Civil Appeals
Oklahoma Court of Civil Appeals

Appellate courts by country

Australia

The High Court has appellate jurisdiction over all other courts. Leave must be granted by the court, before the appeal matter is heard. The High Court is paramount to all federal courts. Further, it has an constitutionally entrenched general power of appeal from the Supreme Courts of the States and Territories. Appeals to the High Court are by special leave only, which is generally only granted in cases of public importance, matters involving the interpretation of the Commonwealth Constitution, or where the law has been inconsistently applied across the States and Territories.[19] Therefore, in the vast majority of cases, the appellate divisions of the Supreme Courts of each State and Territory and the Federal Court are the final courts of appeal.

New Zealand

The Court of Appeal of New Zealand, located in Wellington, is New Zealand's principal intermediate appellate court. In practice, most appeals are resolved at this intermediate appellate level, rather than in the Supreme Court.

Philippines 

The Court of Appeals of the Philippines is the principal intermediate appellate court of that country. The Court of Appeals is primarily found in Manila, with three divisions each in Cebu City and Cagayan de Oro. Other appellate courts include the Sandiganbayan for cases involving graft and corruption, and the Court of Tax Appeals for cases involving tax. Appeals from all three appellate courts are to the Supreme Court.

Sri Lanka

The Court of Appeal of Sri Lanka, located in Colombo, is the second senior court in the Sri Lankan legal system.

United Kingdom

United States

In the United States, both state and federal appellate courts are usually restricted to examining whether the lower court made the correct legal determinations, rather than hearing direct evidence and determining what the facts of the case were. Furthermore, U.S. appellate courts are usually restricted to hearing appeals based on matters that were originally brought up before the trial court. Hence, such an appellate court will not consider an appellant's argument if it is based on a theory that is raised for the first time in the appeal.

In most U.S. states, and in U.S. federal courts, parties before the court are allowed one appeal as of right. This means that a party who is unsatisfied with the outcome of a trial may bring an appeal to contest that outcome. However, appeals may be costly, and the appellate court must find an error on the part of the court below that justifies upsetting the verdict. Therefore, only a small proportion of trial court decisions result in appeals. Some appellate courts, particularly supreme courts, have the power of discretionary review, meaning that they can decide whether they will hear an appeal brought in a particular case.

Institutional titles 
Many U.S. jurisdictions title their appellate court a court of appeal or court of appeals. Historically, others have titled their appellate court a court of errors (or court of errors and appeals), on the premise that it was intended to correct errors made by lower courts. Examples of such courts include the New Jersey Court of Errors and Appeals (which existed from 1844 to 1947), the Connecticut Supreme Court of Errors (which has been renamed the Connecticut Supreme Court), the Kentucky Court of Errors (renamed the Kentucky Supreme Court), and the Mississippi High Court of Errors and Appeals (since renamed the Supreme Court of Mississippi). In some jurisdictions, a court able to hear appeals is known as an appellate division.

The phrase "court of appeals" most often refers to intermediate appellate courts.  However, the New York Court of Appeals is the highest appellate court in New York. The New York Supreme Court is a trial court of general jurisdiction. The Supreme Court of Maryland was known as the Court of Appeals, and the Appellate Court of Maryland was known as the Court of Special Appeals, until a 2022 constitutional amendment changed their names. Depending on the system, certain courts may serve as both trial courts and appellate courts, hearing appeals of decisions made by courts with more limited jurisdiction.

See also
Court of Criminal Appeal (disambiguation)
Court of Appeal (Hong Kong)
High Court (Hong Kong)
Court of Appeal (England and Wales)
Court of cassation

References

Citations

Sources 
 
 Lax, Jeffrey R. "Constructing Legal Rules on Appellate Courts." American Political Science Review 101.3 (2007): 591–604. Sociological Abstracts; Worldwide Political Science Abstracts. Web. 29 May 2012.

Courts by type
Appellate courts
Jurisdiction